Oliverio "Baby" Ortiz (December 5, 1919 – March 27, 1984) was a Cuban-born Major League Baseball pitcher who played for the Washington Senators in . He played parts of nine seasons in the minor leagues from 1944 to 1955, playing for sixteen teams.

External links

1919 births
1984 deaths
Abilene Blue Sox players
Algodoneros de Torreón players
Azules de Veracruz players
Baltimore Orioles (IL) players
Bisbee-Douglas Copper Kings players
Chattanooga Lookouts players
Diablos Rojos del México players
Evansville Braves players
Greenville Spinners players
Hobbs Sports players
Indios de Ciudad Juárez (minor league) players
Major League Baseball pitchers
Miami Beach Flamingos players
Sportspeople from Camagüey
Major League Baseball players from Cuba
Cuban expatriate baseball players in the United States
Roswell Rockets players
Sherman–Denison Twins players
Tucson Cowboys players
Washington Senators (1901–1960) players
Wichita Falls Spudders players
Cuban expatriate baseball players in Mexico